Samuel Hanson Stone (December 4, 1849 near Richmond, Kentucky – April 3, 1909 in Galveston, Texas) was an American politician.

Life 
Stone was born as a son of the merchant, farmer and banker James C. Stone from Leavenworth, Kansas and the daughter of a lawyer Matilda, born Hanson, a sister to the Confederate General Roger Hanson. As from 1864 Stone visited the Lee High School in West-Massachusetts and started in 1866 with his study of jurisprudence at the University of Leipzig (Saxony, Germany). In January 1870 Stone relocated to Heidelberg, Germany where he became – after already becoming a member of the Corps Thuringia in Leipzig – a member of the Corps Rhenania Heidelberg. Within the same year Stone moved back to the U.S. where he started off as an assistant clerk at the Second National Bank in Leavenworth. In 1874 Stone took residence in Madison County, Kentucky as a farmer and entrepreneur. Stone established 1876 close to Fort Estill Station a cattle farm and started to rear thoroughbred horses and rose to become the second biggest tobacco grower in the county.

From 1895 to 1899 Stone officiated as Auditor of Public Accounts for Kentucky. In 1899 he was defeated by the latter – controversial - office holder William S. Taylor (1853-1928) in the nomination campaign as candidate for the Republican Party for the office of Governor of Kentucky by a few votes.

External links 
 Biography

1849 births
1909 deaths
Kentucky Republicans
People from Leavenworth, Kansas